The Solicitor General of Texas is the top appellate solicitor or lawyer for the U.S. state of Texas. It is an appointed position in the Office of the Texas Attorney General that focuses on the office's major appellate cases. The majority of the cases handled by the Solicitor are argued in the United States Supreme Court and the Supreme Court of Texas.  However some cases within the Solicitor's responsibilities are under the jurisdiction of the  United States Court of Appeals for the Fifth Circuit and the state appellate courts. The Solicitor represents the Attorney General of Texas before the Supreme Court of Texas and other appellate courts, as needed. The Office of the Solicitor General writes most of the amicus briefs filed by the Texas attorney general's office.

History 

The position was created in January 1999 by Texas Attorney General John Cornyn and was first filled by Greg Coleman.  It is a similar position to solicitors in many states and is modeled after the Solicitor General of the United States. The office has one principle deputy, two deputies, and other assistant solicitors general.

Notable alumni of the Office of the Solicitor General 

 J. Campbell Barker, Judge of the United States District Court for the Eastern District of Texas, 2019–present
 Jimmy Blacklock, Associate Justice of the Supreme Court of Texas, 2018–present
 Ted Cruz, U.S. Senator from Texas, 2013–present
 S. Kyle Duncan, Judge of the United States Court of Appeals for the Fifth Circuit, 2018–present
 James C. Ho, Judge of the United States Court of Appeals for the Fifth Circuit, 2018–present
 Sean D. Jordan, Judge of the United States District Court for the Eastern District of Texas, 2019–present
 Jonathan F. Mitchell, Chairman of the Administrative Conference of the United States (Nominee)
 Andy Oldham, Judge of the United States Court of Appeals for the Fifth Circuit, 2018–present
 Lawrence VanDyke, Judge of the United States Court of Appeals for the Ninth Circuit, 2020–present, Solicitor General of Nevada (2015–2019), Solicitor General of Montana (2013–2014)

List of solicitors general 

The following is a table of solicitors general of Texas.

Parties
 (7)
 (0)
 (0)

References

External links 
 

 
Government of Texas
Texas law